Keeley Lake is a hamlet in Saskatchewan.

Division No. 18, Unorganized, Saskatchewan
Unincorporated communities in Saskatchewan